() is a reddish centaur with cometary activity orbiting the Sun between Jupiter and Uranus. It was discovered on 18 August 2010, by a team of astronomers with the Pan-STARRS survey at the Haleakalā Observatory, Hawaii. It is the first centaur known to have both comet-like activity and red surface colors. , it has not been named.

Orbit and classification 

This object belongs to the centaurs, a dynamically unstable population of small Solar System bodies with chaotic orbits between the classical asteroids and the trans-Neptunian objects. Centaurs are considered to be objects with short lifetimes of approximately one million years, transitioning from the inactive population of Kuiper belt objects to the active group of Jupiter-family comets.  orbits the Sun at a distance of 6.2–13.7 AU once every 31 years and 3 months (11,404 days; semi-major axis of 9.92 AU). Its orbit has a high eccentricity of 0.38 and an inclination of 19° with respect to the ecliptic. It has a Tisserand's parameter with respect to Jupiter (TJ) of 2.94, near the threshold of 3, typically used to distinguish asteroids from Jupiter-family comets. On 4 June 2014, the object came to perihelion at 6.2 AU and has since been moving away from the Sun.  the object is at 10.7 AU, The body's observation arc begins with its official discovery observation at Haleakalā Observatory in August 2010.

Numbering and naming 

This minor planet was numbered by the Minor Planet Center on 25 September 2018, receiving the number  in the minor planet catalog. , it has not been named. According to the established naming conventions, it will be named after one of the many centaurs from Greek mythology, which are creatures with the upper body of a human and the lower body and legs of a horse.

Physical characteristics 

As with other populations, the centaurs show a bimodal distribution of colors: red and blue-grey. Cometary-like activity is well known among the grey centaurs, prominently represented by 2060 Chiron, which is also the namesake of the Chiron-type comets. However, outgassing activity of red centaurs (e.g. 5145 Pholus) has not been observed.  is the first of the group of red centaurs to display clear evidence of cometary activity.

In October 2014,  was observed by astronomers using the Large Monolithic Imager of the 4.3-meter Discovery Channel Telescope in Arizona. It was the intrinsically faintest object observed for this study, with an absolute magnitude 13.46.

In December 2015, observations with the Galileo National Telescope on the Canary Islands revealed that  exhibits comet-like activity. Further photometric observations gave a dust production rate of  near the object's perihelion at 6.2 AU.

The Collaborative Asteroid Lightcurve Link an estimates a diameter of kilometers 15.3 based on a albedo of 0.057 (carbonaceous) and on an absolute magnitude of 12.8. , no rotational lightcurve of  has been obtained from photometric observations. The body's rotation period, pole and shape remain unknown.

See also

Notes

References

External links 
 Red centaurs, David J. Darling
 List Of Centaurs and Scattered-Disk Objects, Minor Planet Center
 Kuiper Belt Object Magnitudes and Surface Colors, Stephen C. Tegler, June 2018
 Discovery Circumstances: Numbered Minor Planets (520001)-(525000) – Minor Planet Center
 
 

523676
523676
20100818